The 117th Massachusetts General Court, consisting of the Massachusetts Senate and the Massachusetts House of Representatives, met in 1896 during the governorship of Roger Wolcott. George P. Lawrence served as president of the Senate and George von Lengerke Meyer served as speaker of the House.

Notable legislation included "An Act to Provide for the Security and Preservation of the So-called Bulfinch Portion of the State House."

Senators

Representatives

See also
 54th United States Congress
 List of Massachusetts General Courts

References

Further reading

External links
 
 
 

Political history of Massachusetts
Massachusetts legislative sessions
massachusetts
1896 in Massachusetts